"Unpretty" is a song by American group TLC, released on May 17, 1999, through LaFace and Arista Records as the second single from the band's third studio album, FanMail. It was written by Tionne "T-Boz" Watkins and the producer Dallas Austin. Austin assisted Watkins in adapting the latter's written poem into "Unpretty" after feeling disgusted by an episode of American talk show Ricki Lake.

"Unpretty" was the album's second song to top the US Billboard Hot 100, which it did for three weeks. The song topped the chart in Iceland and peaked in the top 10 in Australia, Canada, Ireland, the Netherlands, Norway, New Zealand, Sweden, Switzerland, and the United Kingdom. An accompanying music video was directed by Paul Hunter, which depicts the band situated in three separate storylines. The song was nominated for Song of the Year and Best Pop Performance by a Duo or Group with Vocal at the 42nd Annual Grammy Awards.

Background and composition
Tionne Watkins was in the hospital when she conceived the idea of "Unpretty" after watching an episode of American talk show Ricki Lake, in which the men on the show called women "fat pigs". She wrote the song out as a poem and gave it to Dallas Austin to record in the booth. Austin wanted to incorporate TLC's music into a folk and alternative rock sound. He wrote "Unpretty" as an "acoustic-driven pop song" in order for people to conceive TLC as an established group. Stacy Lambe of VH1 described the song as having an "alternative rock vibe".

Commercial performance
The song peaked at number one on the Billboard Hot 100, spending three weeks atop the chart. It was the second consecutive number-one single from the album, following "No Scrubs". Worldwide, the song reached number one in Iceland for a week and peaked within the top 10 in Australia, Canada, Ireland, the Netherlands, Norway, New Zealand, Sweden, Switzerland, and the UK. It was nominated for Song of the Year and Best Pop Performance by a Duo or Group with Vocal at the 42nd Annual Grammy Awards.

Music video

Background
Paul Hunter directed the music video for "Unpretty", which was filmed in June 1999 in Valencia, California, and cost over $1.6 million in production. A shortened edit of the video was created, which was released to an all-ages audience (as "Children's Version"), that removes both Watkins and Lopes' solo storylines, as some of the scenes were deemed as too explicit.

Synopsis
The video begins with the TLC members entering a meditation hut. As the three women begin to meditate, a probe camera is released to record images of struggles in daily life, which ties together vignettes of several different stories relating to the song's lyrics. Several shots of TLC meditating and in a pink and purple field of flowers are shown intermittently throughout the video.

The main set of vignettes features a young woman, portrayed by band member Chilli, and an overweight teenager (played by actress Tamika Katon-Donegal). Chilli's boyfriend convinces her to get breast implants to augment her modest bust. However, after she sees another patient in the hospital (played by singer Jade Villalon) getting her implants painfully removed, the woman flees the hospital in fear, and is later shown fighting with her boyfriend when she catches him reading magazines of busty women. The other girl is worried about fitting the "ideal" image of the petite supermodel and struggling with a bulimia as a result. Near the end of the video, however, she tears down the unrealistic images of models that she has tacked on her wall and changes into a bathing suit, a sign that she may be starting to accept her body shape.

Another vignette features Watkins as a high school student who is harassed by two white kids because she is a girl (which is based on what she dealt with in high school), only to be saved by her teacher, who sends the white kids away and retrieves her stuff for her. The last vignette features Lopes as an inner-city woman who plays her verse from "I'm Good at Being Bad" to her friend in her car. They come across a city gang, who are approached by a rival gang who begin to threaten them. The two gangs start fighting, which becomes so violent that knives and guns are involved and Lopes and her friend duck for cover as her car window is damaged. When the fight subsides, Lopes leaves the car to assist the remaining injured and barely conscious survivors. One of the survivors has been mortally wounded due to being stabbed in the heart, so Lopes applies pressure on his chest to stop the bleeding and prays as they wait for the police to arrive. Lopes also appears in the "Unpretty" performance shots reciting the song lyrics in American Sign Language.

Track listings

US CD and cassette single (green cover)
 "Unpretty" (album version) – 4:38
 "Unpretty" ("Don't Look Any Further" remix) – 4:25

US 12-inch maxi single (green cover)
 "Unpretty" (radio version) – 4:01
 "Unpretty" ("Don't Look Any Further" remix) – 4:26
 "Unpretty" ("Don't Look Any Further" remix a cappella) – 4:26
 "Unpretty" (Pumpin' Dolls club mix) – 8:59
 "Unpretty" ("Don't Look Any Further" remix w/ rap) – 4:26

European CD single (green cover)
 "Unpretty" (radio version) – 4:05
 "Unpretty" (M. J. Cole remix—vox up) – 4:46

UK CD single 1 (green cover)
 "Unpretty" (radio version) – 4:08
 "No Scrubs" (radio version w/ rap) – 4:06
 "Diggin' on You" (radio version) – 4:13

UK CD single 2 (blue cover)
 "Unpretty" (radio version) – 4:08
 "Unpretty" (M. J. Cole remix—vox up) – 4:48
 "Unpretty" ("Don't Look Any Further" remix) – 4:25

European and Australian CD maxi single 1 (green cover)
 "Unpretty" (radio version) – 4:05
 "Unpretty" (album version) - 4:38
 "Unpretty" (M. J. Cole remix—vox up) – 4:46
 "Unpretty" (M. J. Cole remix—budd dub) – 5:36
 "Unpretty" (instrumental) - 4:43

European and Australian maxi single 2 (blue cover)
 "Unpretty" (radio version) – 4:01
 "Unpretty" ("Don't Look Any Further" remix w/o rap) – 4:26
 "Unpretty" ("Don't Look Any Further" remix w/ rap) – 4:26
 "Unpretty" (Pumpin' Dolls radio mix) – 4:03
 "Unpretty" ("Don't Look Any Further" remix—Big Boyz dub mix) – 5:00
 "Unpretty" (Pumpin' Dolls club mix) – 8:59

German maxi single (blue cover)
 "Unpretty" (radio version) – 4:01
 "Unpretty" ("Don't Look Any Further" remix w/o rap) – 4:26
 "Unpretty" ("Don't Look Any Further" remix w/ rap) – 4:26
 "Unpretty" (Pumpin' Dolls radio mix) – 4:03
 "Unpretty" ("Don't Look Any Further" remix—Big Boyz dub mix) – 5:00
 "Unpretty" (Pumpin' Dolls club mix) – 8:59
 "Unpretty" (Amber Remix)" - 4:36

Credits and personnel
Credits for "Unpretty" adapted from AllMusic.

 Sharliss Asbury – A&R
 Dallas Austin – arranger, composer, executive producer, producer
 Leslie Brathwaite - engineer
 MJ Cole – producer, remixing
 Regina Davenport – A&R
 Jonathan Donker – engineer, mixing, producer, remixing
 Kenneth Edmonds – executive producer
 Dennis Edwards – composer
 Franne Golde – composer
 Duane Hitchings - composer
 Ty Hudson – assistant
 Debra Killings – bass, vocals (background)
 Tom Knight – drums
 Mike "Mad" Lewin – engineer, mixing, producer, remixing

 Andrew Lyn – remix assistant 
 Carlton Lynn – engineer
 Tomi Martin – guitar
 Vernon Mungo – assistant
 Charlie O'Brien – creative coordinator
 Herb Powers – mastering
 Kawan "KP" Prather – A&R
 L.A. Reid – executive producer
 Rick Sheppard – design
 Alvin Speights – mixing
 TLC – creative concept, executive producer, primary artist
 Candy Tookes – A&R
 D.L. Warfield – art direction, design
 Tionne "T-Boz" Watkins – composer

Charts

Weekly charts

Year-end charts

Decade-end charts

Certifications

Release history

References

1999 singles
TLC (group) songs
Billboard Hot 100 number-one singles
Number-one singles in Iceland
Music videos directed by Paul Hunter (director)
Songs based on poems
Songs written by Dallas Austin
Songs written by Tionne Watkins
Song recordings produced by Dallas Austin
Songs with feminist themes
Songs about consumerism
Body image in popular culture
1998 songs
LaFace Records singles
1990s ballads
American pop rock songs
Ugliness